Kampyli (“castle village”, previously ) is a small Turkish Cypriot village in Cyprus, located approximately  east of Myrtou. It is under the de facto control of Northern Cyprus. In 1831, 30% of the village's inhabitants were Maronites. They all left by 1940, and, around that time, Muslim families from Larnakas tis Lapithou moved into Kampyli. As of 2011, Kampyli had population of 194.

References

Communities in Kyrenia District
Populated places in Girne District